Eric Morse (26 August 1918 – 2 March 2010) was an Australian cricketer. He played three first-class matches for Tasmania between 1945 and 1947.

See also
 List of Tasmanian representative cricketers

References

External links
 

1918 births
2010 deaths
Australian cricketers
Tasmania cricketers
Cricketers from Tasmania